"Shuffle Off to Buffalo" is a song written by Al Dubin and Harry Warren and introduced in the 1933 musical film 42nd Street, in which Ruby Keeler and Clarence Nordstrom sang and danced to it. Ginger Rogers, Una Merkel, and the Chorus also performed it in the film. 

Popular recordings in 1933 were by Don Bestor (vocal by Maurice Cross) and by Hal Kemp (vocal by Skinnay Ennis). The song was also popular on the radio in that year and was later performed and recorded by the Boswell Sisters, the Three X Sisters and The Andrews Sisters.

It was recorded by Roy Smeck and presented by The Lawrence Welk Show on television. Comedy acts with the song have included Abbott and Costello, Laurel and Hardy, Fred Gwynne, and The Odd Couple.

The lyrics talk about going by railroad train "to Niag'ra in a sleeper" for a honeymoon.  Niagara Falls, near Buffalo, New York, was long a popular honeymoon destination. Earlier use of phrases similar to the title in US popular tunes include the 1927 tune "Off to Buffalo" by Joe Candullo and Jack Carroll, recorded by Fletcher Henderson's Orchestra, and Irving Berlin's lyrics to George Botsford's 1910 hit "The Grizzly Bear" which includes the line "Show your darling beau just how you go to Buffalo". Also, the 1985 John Fogerty song "Rock and Roll Girls" from his album Centerfield contains the lyrics "If I had my way, I'd shuffle off to Buffalo and sit by the lake
and watch the world go by."

Tap dance
Shuffle Off to Buffalo is also a tap dance step using the shuffle technique.

References

1933 songs
Songs with music by Harry Warren
Songs with lyrics by Al Dubin
Songs about New York (state)
Songs about dancing
Songs written for films